Caxton and CTP Publishers and Printers (JSE: CAT) is a South African newspaper company.

History
The company was founded in 1902 by William Gindra and Edward Green, two Pretoria businessmen who started a small stationery and general printing factory in Pretorius Street and named it after early English printer William Caxton. In 1947, Dr HJ van der Bijl became chairman of the board; he was the driving force behind the company going public the same year, as Caxton Ltd.

In 1961, Caxton was purchased by Eagle Press and at the same time acquired its first newspaper, the South African Jewish Times. During the same year Caxton moved its operations to Doornfontein in Johannesburg. In 1968, Caxton again changed ownership, this time to Felstar Publications. During the same year, The Germiston Eagle was introduced as a weekly supplement to the South African Jewish Times. This was the forerunner of all community newspapers in South Africa.

By 1978, Caxton were publishing the following newspapers either fortnightly, monthly or weekly: Sandton Chronicle, North Eastern Tribune, Northcliff and Blackheath Times, Randburg Sun, Southern Courier, Mayfair-Brixton, Newlands-Melville Telegraph, Rosebank Killarney Gazette and Roodepoort Record.

In 1985, Caxton acquired CTP (Cape and Transvaal Printers), a R100-million printing company. This enabled Caxton to meet the growing demand for the high-speed, high-quality printing of newspapers and magazines. Caxton/CTP (as the company became popularly known) later consolidated their various subsidiary companies under the CTP banner and, post-1994, formed a partnership with the National Empowerment Consortium (NEC).

Caxton and another publisher, Perskor, merged in July 1998, forming a company with a turnover in excess of ZAR R2 billion a year. As a result of the merger The Citizen, a daily newspaper, was also acquired.

Magazines
Caxton/CTP's magazine division publishes fifteen titles in the following sectors: family magazines, women's magazines, home, lifestyle and decor, lifestyle and entertainment, religion and farming. Of them, Bona, Country Life, Essentials, Food & Home, Garden & Home, People, Rooi Rose, Vrouekeur, Woman & Home and Your Family were all closed by the company in May 2020.

Newspapers

Caxton/CTP's newspaper division either owns or co-owns 88 titles, although a significant number of these are free community newspapers. The division's newspapers operate from fifty offices in eight of South Africa's nine provinces and have a combined print run of over two million copies.

Websites

Of the five newspaper titles which Caxton is involved with, 72 titles have websites which are regularly updated. This group of sites is known as the Local News Network; a network of hyperlocal websites which run daily community content. Local News Network and the success of The Citizen’s website makes Caxton the second-largest digital publisher in South Africa, as per Effective Measure statistics from August 2018. Caxton also owns Looklocal, a news aggregator which delivers hyperlocal and international content, classifieds and events listings.

List of Local News Network websites

 Alex News
 City Buzz
 Fourways Review
 Midrand Reporter
 North Eastern Tribune
 Rosebank/Killarney Gazette
 Sandton Chronicle
 African Reporter
 Alberton Record
 Bedfordview Edenvale News
 Benoni City Times
 Boksburg Advertiser
 Brakpan Herald
 Comaro Chronicle
 Germiston City News
 Joburg East Express
 Kempton Express
 Southern Courier
 Springs Advertiser
 Tembisan
 Krugersdorp News
 Randfontein Herald
 Roodeport Record
 Roodeport Northsider
 Northcliff/Melville Times
 Randburg Sun
 Pretoria Record Centurion
 Pretoria Record East
 Pretoria Record Moot
 Pretoria Record North
 Barberton Times
 Corridor Gazette
 Echo Ridge
 Hazyview Herald
 Lowvelder
 Mpumalanga News
 Nelspruit Post
 Ridge Times
 Steelburger/Lydenburg News
 White River Post
 Middleburg Observer
 Witbank News
 Estcourt /Midlands News
 Ladysmith Gazette
 Newcastle Advertiser
 Northern Natal Courier
 Vryheid Herald
 Berea Mail
 Highway Mail
 Northglen News
 South Coast Sun
 Southlands Sun
 Zululand Observer
 North Coast Courier
 Chatsworth Rising Sun
 Overport Rising Sun
 Phoenix Sun
 South Coast Herald
 Maritzburg Sun
 Public Eye
 Heidelberg/Nigel Heraut
 Lenasia Rising Sun
 Echo Ridge
 Highvelder
 Ridge Times
 Standerton Advertiser
 Standerton Ibis

See also

 Avusa
 Caxton Printers
 Independent News and Media
 List of companies traded on the Johannesburg Stock Exchange
 List of companies of South Africa
 List of South African media
 Naspers
 Style (magazine)

References

External links
 
 The Citizen (daily newspaper owned by the group)
 Looklocal (news aggregator)
 Local News Network (network of hyperlocal news sites)

1902 establishments in South Africa
Companies based in Johannesburg
Companies listed on the Johannesburg Stock Exchange
Magazine publishing companies
Newspaper companies
Mass media companies of South Africa
Organisations based in Pretoria
Printing companies
Publishing companies established in 1902
Publishing companies of South Africa